Switzerland competed at the 1968 Summer Olympics in Mexico City, Mexico. 85 competitors, 81 men and 4 women, took part in 68 events in 12 sports.

Medalists

Silver
 Bernhard Dunand, Louis Noverraz and Marcel Stern — Sailing, Men's 5½ Meter Class

Bronze
 Xaver Kurmann — Cycling, Men's 4000m Individual Pursuit
 Henri Chammartin, Gustav Fischer and Marianne Gossweiler — Equestrian, Dressage Team Competition
 Peter Bolliger, Gottlieb Fröhlich, Jakob Grob, Denis Oswald and Hugo Waser — Rowing, Men's Coxed Fours
 Kurt Müller — Shooting, Men's Free Rifle, Three Positions

Athletics

Boxing

Cycling

Four cyclists represented Switzerland in 1968.

Individual road race
 Bruno Hubschmid

Individual pursuit
 Xaver Kurmann

Team pursuit
 Walter Richard
 Jürgen Schneider
 Bruno Hubschmid
 Xaver Kurmann

Equestrian

Fencing

Five fencers, all men, represented Switzerland in 1968.

Men's épée
 Peter Lötscher
 Michel Steininger
 Alexandre Bretholz

Men's team épée
 Denys Chamay, Peter Lötscher, Christian Kauter, Alexandre Bretholz, Michel Steininger

Gymnastics

Modern pentathlon

One male pentathlete represented Switzerland in 1968.

Individual
 Alex Tschui

Rowing

Sailing

Shooting

Ten shooters, all men, represented Switzerland in 1968. Kurt Müller won bronze in the 300 m rifle, three positions event.

25 m pistol
 Kurt Klingler
 Josef Ziltener

50 m pistol
 Ernst Stoll
 Albert Späni

300 m rifle, three positions
 Kurt Müller
 Erwin Vogt

50 m rifle, three positions
 Kurt Müller
 Peter Ruch

50 m rifle, prone
 Hansruedi Schafroth
 Hans Sinniger

Skeet
 Paul Vittet

Swimming

Wrestling

References

Nations at the 1968 Summer Olympics
1968
1968 in Swiss sport